The Ely Marathon is a race in Ely, Minnesota, first run in 2015. After successfully adding a sanctioned "canoe portager" category in the half marathon, the category was added to the marathon in 2018. In the "canoe portage," runners can compete with the others who carry a canoe over their heads, deeming the race "the 8,390 rod portage." It is the only marathon portage in the world, so the first finisher in 2018 set a world record. The record was broken in 2019 by more than 23 minutes. In 2016, Daniel Drehmel ran the marathon with his partner, Abby Dare, and the two of them took turns carrying the canoe in order to raise awareness about the potential threats to the Boundary Waters Canoe Area Wilderness.  

The race is run in September, and 97 runners finished in 2018.
The course begins deep in the woods at "Camp Du Nord" the north side of Burntside Lake, and finishes in Ely. Racers must be shuttled there, as there is not enough room for parking and camping near the starting line. 

In March and April 2020, as the COVID-19 pandemic forced cancellations of all the major marathons around the world, the Ely Marathon staff hoped the marathon would go on as planned. They worked on ways to run the races while protecting them health of the runners and held the September start date. 

But on July 10, they cancelled all races for 2020, and announced that all registrations could roll into the 2021 races. Only the 5K would have a virtual race. A press release said that state officials "set the maximum participants in outdoor races to 25 people. That includes all racers, staff, volunteers and spectators."

Winners
Key:

References

External links

Foot races in Minnesota
Marathons in Minnesota
Marathons in the United States
Recurring sporting events established in 2015